Jack W. Hawksworth (born 28 February 1991) is a British professional racing driver from Bradford, West Yorkshire. , he competes in the WeatherTech SportsCar Championship for AIM Vasser Sullivan.

He has also raced in the Star Mazda Championship, Formula Renault 2.0, IndyCar Series, and NASCAR Xfinity Series.

Biography
He started racing karts at 13 years old and was Junior Rotax Euro Max champion and second in the World finals by the time he was 15. After graduating from Juniors, Hawksworth went on to have a career as a professional karter leading to success in KZ1 karting winning the 2009 Trofeo Margutti as well as winning races in the German championship and claiming podiums in the KZ1 and KZ2 European Championships finishing sixth overall in the 2010 KZ1 European Championship for the Maddox Team. In a one-off appearance to domestic racing Hawksworth won the 2010 British Kart Masters Grand Prix in Senior Max with Protrain Racing.

Hawksworth graduated to open wheel racing in late 2010 and competed in the 2010 Formula Renault Winter series with Mark Burdett Motorsport. He claimed pole position in four out of the six races and finished third overall in the championship and top rookie ahead of the Red Bull Juniors of Daniil Kvyat, Carlos Sainz, Jr. and McLaren Autosport Award winner Oliver Rowland. Hawksworth went on to compete in the 2011 Formula Renault UK championship changing teams halfway through and finishing fourth overall in the series with a win at Croft.

In 2012 Hawksworth moved to the United States to compete in the 2012 Star Mazda Championship season with Team Pelfrey as part of the Mazda Road to Indy. He broke every record in the series (wins, poles and fastest laps) on his way to claiming the title in his rookie campaign. The driver climbed to the Indy Lights for 2013, by joining Schmidt Peterson Motorsports.

During a practice session for the 2014 Pocono IndyCar 500, Hawksworth suffered a myocardial contusion after a crash, and missed the race.

On 11 November 2016, it was announced that 3GT Racing had signed Hawksworth and Robert Alon to race the No. 15 Lexus RC F GT3 in the 2017 IMSA WeatherTech SportsCar Championship in the GT Daytona class. Hawksworth and Alon competed in the first eight races of the 2017 IMSA WeatherTech SportsCar Championship together before a team decision saw Alon switch places with veteran Scott Pruett for the final four rounds. Hawksworth and Alon recorded a season's best finish of fifth in GT Daytona for the No. 15 at the 2017 6 Hours of Watkins Glen.

In August 2019, Hawksworth made his NASCAR Xfinity Series debut in the 2019 B&L Transport at Mid-Ohio Sports Car Course, driving the No. 18 Toyota Supra for Joe Gibbs Racing after Jeffrey Earnhardt left the team.

Racing record

(key)

Star Mazda Championship

Indy Lights

IndyCar Series

Indianapolis 500

Complete IMSA SportsCar Championship results
(key)(Races in bold indicate pole position, Results are overall/class)

† Points only counted towards the WeatherTech Sprint Cup and not the overall GTD Championship.
* Season still in progress.

Complete Blancpain GT World Challenge Europe results
(key) (Races in bold indicate pole position) (Races in italics indicate fastest lap)

NASCAR
(key) (Bold – Pole position awarded by qualifying time. Italics – Pole position earned by points standings or practice time. * – Most laps led.)

Xfinity Series

References

External links

1991 births
Sportspeople from Bradford
English racing drivers
Indianapolis 500 drivers
IndyCar Series drivers
Indy Lights drivers
British Formula Renault 2.0 drivers
Indy Pro 2000 Championship drivers
Living people
24 Hours of Daytona drivers
WeatherTech SportsCar Championship drivers
NASCAR drivers
Mercedes-AMG Motorsport drivers
Strakka Racing drivers
Tech 1 Racing drivers
Joe Gibbs Racing drivers
Starworks Motorsport drivers
Bryan Herta Autosport drivers
A. J. Foyt Enterprises drivers
Team Pelfrey drivers
Arrow McLaren SP drivers
KTR drivers
Mark Burdett Motorsport drivers
Van Amersfoort Racing drivers
Formula Renault 2.0 NEC drivers
Michelin Pilot Challenge drivers